Trancas may refer to:

Places
Trancas, Argentina, a municipality in Tucumán Province, Argentina
Trancas Department, a department located in the northern part of Tucumán Province, Argentina
Las Trancas, a subdivision of Guararé District, Los Santos Province, Panama
Trancas, a subdivision of the Agoura Hills-Malibu division in Los Angeles County, California
Trancas Street, an arterial road connecting the Saint Helena Highway to the Silverado Trail in Napa County, California

Other
Trancas (album), a 1984 LP released by John Stewart